Christine Johnston (born 4 January 1950) is a novelist from New Zealand.

Background 

Johnston was born 4 January 1950 in Dunedin, New Zealand. She was educated at St Dominic's College and the University of Otago.

Works 

Johnston writes fiction for adults and young adults, both novels and short stories. Her fiction has  been broadcast on national radio and appeared in journals, including Landfall, Metro, and Sport. Her writing is often set in the suburbs and towns of New Zealand and deals with everyday aspects of life and interactions, including the Themes also included childhood, adolescence and adulthood.

Novels 
 Blessed Art Though Among Women (1991)
 Goodbye Molly McGuire (1994), young adult novel
 The Haunting of Lara Lawson (1995), young adult novel 
 A Friend of Jack McGuire (1996), young adult novel
 The Shark Bell (2002)

Short stories 
 The End of the Century (1999)
Her reflections on Catholisim are included in the book, The Source of the Song.

Awards 
Her novel, Blessed Art Though Among Women, won the Heinemann Reed Fiction Award in 1990. In 1994 she was awarded the Robert Burns Fellowship, a literary residency at the University of Otago in Dunedin, New Zealand. She was the winner of the Unity Books Very Short Story Collection in 2003.

References

Further reading 
Short stories available through the New Zealand Electronic Text Collection
A discussion with Christine Johnston on Christchurch Library's Interviewswith NZ Children's Authors
Interview with Johnston as part of Burns Fellowship 50th Anniversary 

Living people
1950 births
New Zealand fiction writers
New Zealand women novelists
New Zealand children's writers
New Zealand women children's writers
New Zealand women short story writers
Writers from Dunedin
University of Otago alumni